Shun Tin is a proposed MTR station on the proposed . It will be located at Shun Lee, Kwun Tong District, Kowloon, Hong Kong. The station is still under planning.

References

Kwun Tong District
Proposed railway stations in Hong Kong
MTR stations in Kowloon